Cnodalonini is a tribe of darkling beetles in the family Tenebrionidae. There are about 13 genera and at least 20 described species in Cnodalonini.

Genera
These 13 genera belong to the tribe Cnodalonini:

 Alobates Motschoulsky, 1872 g b
 Apsida Lacordaire, 1859 g b
 Cibdelis Mannerheim, 1843 g b
 Coelocnemis Mannerheim, 1843 g b
 Glyptotus Leconte, 1858 b
 Haplandrus Leconte, 1862 g b
 Iphthiminus Spilman, 1973 g b
 Merinus Leconte, 1862 g b
 Oenopion Champion, 1885 b
 Polopinus Casey, 1924 g b
 Polypleurus Eschscholtz, 1831 b
 Upis Fabricius, 1792 g b
 Xylopinus Leconte, 1862 g b

Data sources: i = ITIS, c = Catalogue of Life, g = GBIF, b = Bugguide.net

References

Further reading

External links

 

Tenebrionidae